Glutamicibacter protophormiae is a bacterium belonging to the genus Glutamicibacter. It contains a glycolipid 3-[O-α-D-mannopyranosyl-(1→3)-O-α-D-mannopyranosyl]-sn-1,2-diglyceride (DMDG). It has peptidoglycan type A4α with a bridge of (Lys–Ala–L-Glu). It has unsaturated menaquinones, dominated by MK-8. It does not contain the lipid phosphatidylinositol.

The species was described by O. Lysenko in 1959 with genus Brevibacterium. B. protophormiae was reclassified in 1984 as Arthrobacter protophormiae and as Glutamicibacter protophormiae in 2016.

The cell wall of G. protophormiae contains a teichoic acid that contains glucose, glycerol, glucosamine, and galactosamine.

References

Micrococcaceae